Shadrinsk is a town in Kurgan Oblast, Russia, located on the left bank of the Iset River (Ob's basin)  northwest of Kurgan. Population:

History

Shadrinsk was founded in 1662 as an agricultural and trade settlement. Shadrinsk hosted the second largest fair in the Urals region. Town status was granted to it from 1712 to 1737 and in 1781.

Administrative and municipal status
Within the framework of administrative divisions, Shadrinsk serves as the administrative center of Shadrinsky District, even though it is not a part of it. As an administrative division, it is incorporated separately as Shadrinsk Town Under Oblast Jurisdiction—an administrative unit with a status equal to that of the districts. As a municipal division, Shadrinsk Town Under Oblast Jurisdiction is incorporated as Shadrinsk Urban Okrug.

Climate

Shadrinsk has a humid continental climate (Köppen climate classification Dfb), with very cold winters and warm summers. Precipitation is moderate, but is significantly higher in summer than at other times of the year.
In the last 5 years there has been a trend towards hot May and dry August(for about 23 days, the temperature in the town was above 30 degrees!).

Economy

There is a hydraulic systems plant (ShAAZ, Shadrinsky Avtoagregatny Zavod) in the town, which manufactures auto parts. The plant is controlled by the Ural Mining Metallurgical Company (UMMC). Another plant is Shadrinsk Milk Canning Plant. It produces dairy products and Shadrinskaya brand mineral water.

Military
The town is home to Shadrinsk air base which is a minor airlift facility.

Education
Educational facilities include Shadrinsk State Pedagogical university and Shadrinsk Industrial-Pedagogical Technical School.

Twin cities 
Twin cities are cities with which twinning agreements have been concluded.

References

Notes

Sources

External links
Official website of Shadrinsk 
Mojgorod.ru. Entry on Shadrinsk 

Cities and towns in Kurgan Oblast
Shadrinsky Uyezd
Шадринск.рф - городской информационный портал